Hockey Club Salavat Yulaev, commonly referred as Salavat Yulaev Ufa, is a professional ice hockey team based in Ufa in the Republic of Bashkortostan, a federal subject of the Russian Federation. They are members of the Chernyshev Division of the Kontinental Hockey League.

Established in 1961, Salavat Yulaev spent the Soviet era mainly in the lower divisions, only appearing in the top league for five seasons, though since the dissolution of the Soviet Union they have been in the top league in Russia.

They have won the Gagarin Cup as the KHL champion once, in 2011, and have won the regular season championship twice, in 2009 and 2010, winning the inaugural Continental Cup for the latter. They also won the final Russian Superleague title, in 2008.

History

Soviet era
Founded in 1961, the club is named after Salavat Yulaev, a national hero of Bashkortostan. After years of competing in the low-level divisions the team was invited to the second level of the Soviet League "Class A" in 1964, subsequently getting promotion to the elite group for the 1978-1979, 1980-81, 1982-83, 1985-1986 and 1986-1987 seasons.

Post-Soviet era
Salavat Yulaev was one of the founding clubs of the International Hockey League and later the Russian Superleague, and normally advanced to the playoffs at that time. The club reached its first Russian championship semifinals in 1996-97 and eventually won its first Championship title in 2007-08, beating Lokomotiv Yaroslavl by three matches to two.

KHL era
On July 11, 2008, Salavat signed NHL rising star Alexander Radulov.
On June 9, 2009, a press release was issued, stating that Viktor Kozlov had signed a three-year contract to return to Russia. The club has also signed Norwegian forward Patrick Thoresen for the 2009–10 and 2010–11 seasons.

Salavat Yulaev marked its first year in the KHL by winning its first two regular season titles and becoming the first club to be awarded the Continental Cup. The following season, the team advanced to the final against Atlant and won their first Gagarin Cup as champions. They remained a powerful club in the KHL over the following seasons, reaching the playoffs each year, though did not advance past the conference finals in any year.

In March 2022, all four Finnish players, including the all-time scoring leader Teemu Hartikainen, and Geoff Platt and Philip Larsen left the team due to the Russian invasion of Ukraine.

Season-by-season KHL record
Note: GP = Games played, W = Wins, OTW = Overtime Wins, SOW = Penalty Shootout Wins, SOL = Penalty Shootout Losses, OTL = Overtime Losses, L = Losses, GF = Goals for, GA = Goals against, Pts = Points

Players

Current roster

Franchise records and leaders

Scoring leaders

These are the top-ten point-scorers in KHL history. Figures are updated after each completed KHL regular season.

Note: Pos = Position; GP = Games played; G = Goals; A = Assists; Pts = Points; P/G = Points per game;  = current Salavat Yulaev Ufa playerHonours
Champions
 Gagarin Cup (1): 2011
 KHL Regular Season / Continental Cup (2): 2009, 2010
 Opening Cup (2): 2008–09, 2011-12
 Russian Superleague (1): 2008
 Federation Cup (1): 1995
 Soviet League Class A2 (5): 1978, 1980, 1982, 1985, 1992
 Pajulahti Cup (1): 2003
 Clas Ohlson Cup (1): 2009

Runners-up
 KHL 2013–14, 2015–16
 Continental Cup (1): 1997
 Spengler Cup (2): 2007, 2014
 Russian Superleague (1): 1997
 IHL Championship (1)'': 1995

References

External links

  

 
Ice hockey teams in Russia
Sport in Ufa
Kontinental Hockey League teams
Chernyshev Division (KHL)
Ice hockey clubs established in 1961
1961 establishments in Russia